Utopia (also known as Utopía, la película) is a 2018 Peruvian drama film directed by Gino Tassara & Jorge Vilela de Rutte. It is based on Utopía nightclub fire that occurred on July 24, 2002.

Synopsis 
Julián, a frustrated investigative journalist, is obsessed with reopening the Utopia Case, the fire at the most exclusive nightclub in Lima where 29 young people died. After several comings and goings, Julián begins his investigation and learns about the drama of the bereaved in their search for justice. Relive key moments of the case finding more questions than answers.

Cast 

 Renzo Schuller as Julian Contreras.
 Rossana Fernández-Maldonado as Elizabeth Rasmusen (Julián's Girlfriend).
 Carlos Solano as Victor Calahua (Utopia's Bartender who helps Julián with the investigation)

Release 
The film was released in Peruvian theaters on September 27, 2018. The film premiered on Netflix on January 7, 2022.

Reception 
The film in its first weekend exceeded 115,000 spectators. At the end of the year, the film attracts more than 560,000 spectators to the cinema, becoming the fourth Peruvian film in 2018.

References

External links 

 

2018 films
2018 drama films
2018 action drama films
Peruvian action drama films
2010s Peruvian films
2010s Spanish-language films

Films set in Peru
Films shot in Peru
Films about death
Films about fires